Pin Hook Branch is a stream in Ste. Genevieve County in the U.S. state of Missouri. It is a tributary of Fourche a Du Clos.

Pin Hook Branch was so named because its course has an irregular shape, like a pinhook.

See also
List of rivers of Missouri

References

Rivers of Ste. Genevieve County, Missouri
Rivers of Missouri